Dr. Nancy M. Stuart is an American portrait photographer, as well as a photography educator and administrator. She is the dean of the University of Hartford's art school. From 1975 through 1984, Stuart was a founding faculty member of Lansing Community College's Photo Technology Program. She has served as provost at the Cleveland Institute of Art, and was an associate dean at Rochester Institute of Technology. Her work, DES Stories: Faces and Voices of People Exposed to Diethylstilbestrol was published (2001) and exhibited in the United States. She received the John Kobal prize at the National Portrait Gallery, London for the DES Stories project.

Education
She received a Ph.D. (2005) from University at Buffalo, The State University of New York; her dissertation was entitled, The History of Photographic Education in Rochester, N.Y. 1960–1980. Stuart wrote the chapter, "Photographic Higher Education in the United States", in The Focal Encyclopedia of Photography.

See also
 List of women photographers

References

Year of birth missing (living people)
Living people
American portrait photographers
University at Buffalo alumni
Cleveland Institute of Art faculty
Rochester Institute of Technology administrators
American women photographers
American women academics
21st-century American women